Jasmi Joensuu (born 7 May 1996) is a Finnish cross-country skier.

Joensuu participated in FIS Nordic World Ski Championships 2021 in Oberstdorf, where she won the bronze medal with the Finnish team in women's 4 × 5 km relay.

She was part of two NCAA Championship Skiing Teams (2016 and 2018) at the University of Denver, where she was a three-time all-America selection.

Cross-country skiing results
All results are sourced from the International Ski Federation (FIS).

Olympic Games

World Championships
1 medal – (1 bronze)

World Cup

Season standings

References

External links

Living people
1996 births
Finnish female cross-country skiers
People from Kuortane
FIS Nordic World Ski Championships medalists in cross-country skiing
Cross-country skiers at the 2022 Winter Olympics
Olympic cross-country skiers of Finland
Sportspeople from South Ostrobothnia
21st-century Finnish women